The 2015–16 Cayman Islands Premier League season was the 37th season of top-tier football in the Cayman Islands. It began on 18 October 2015 and will end on 29 May 2016. Scholars International were the defending champions, having won their 9th title last season. Scholars International won their 10th title this season.

Clubs 

Cayman Brac FC finished 8th at the conclusion of last season and were relegated. Taking their place in this season was Academy SC.

Roma United finished 7th at the conclusion of last season and had to participate in a play-off, which they won. Therefore, they remain in the Premier League for this season.

Table 
Source

Promotion/relegation playoff
The 7th place team in this competition will face the runners-up of the First Division for a place in next season's competition.

Results

Regular Home Games

Additional Home Games

References 

Cayman Islands Premier League seasons
2015–16 in Caribbean football leagues
Prem